Sergei Alexandrovich Magerovski (born September 17, 1980) is a former competitive ice dancer who represented Russia and the United States in competition.

Personal life 
Sergei Magerovski was born on September 17, 1980, in Moscow. He was formerly married to Rebecca Magerovski. He is the elder brother of Mikhail Magerovski, who competed internationally for Russia as a single skater.

Career 
Magerovski began learning to skate in 1988 and switched from singles to ice dancing when he was about 15. Competing for Russia with Ksenia Kashnikova, he placed 7th at the 1998–99 ISU Junior Grand Prix in France. The following season, he placed 5th with Anna Motovilova at the 2000 Russian Junior Championships.

Following those partnerships, Magerovski moved to the United States. He placed 9th at the 2004 U.S. Championships with his then-wife, Rebecca Magerovski. He competed with Tiffany Stiegler in the 2004–05 and 2005–06 seasons. Stiegler/Magerovski won the pewter medal at the 2005 U.S. Championships. They were coached by Igor Sphilband and Marina Zueva in Canton, Michigan.

Magerovski works as a skating coach.

Programs 
with Stiegler

Competitive highlights
GP: Grand Prix; JGP: Junior Grand Prix

With Stiegler for the United States

With Rebecca Magerovskiy

With Kashnikova and Motovilova for Russia

References

External links 
 

American male ice dancers
Russian male ice dancers
1980 births
Living people
Figure skaters from Moscow